Sean Horlor (born January 11, 1981) is a Canadian film director, film producer, poet, actor, television producer, columnist and blogger.

Early life
Born in Edmonton, Alberta, Horlor grew up in Victoria, British Columbia. He has an undergraduate degree in fine arts from the University of Victoria.

Personal life
Horlor is gay and currently resides in Vancouver, British Columbia.

Career
Horlor is also a filmmaker, writer, poet, and actor who works in film and television. Horlor is the author of Made Beautiful by Use (2007), published by Signature Editions. He is best known as the co-host and co-creator of Don't Quit Your Gay Job, an original Canadian comedy television series that was premiered on OUTtv in 2009.

He is a co-founder and co-owner with Steve J. Adams of Nootka St. Film Company based in Vancouver, British Columbia, Canada. Horlor and Adams have written, directed, and produced several short films together including The Day Don Died about the death and resurrection of a jazz singer on Easter Weekend and Brunch Queen about a gay couple who own an infamous insult diner in Vancouver.

Horlor and Adams premiered their debut feature documentary Someone Like Me at the 2021 Hot Docs Canadian International Documentary Festival, where it won a Rogers Audience Award and finished as a Top 5 Audience Favourite for the festival. Produced by the National Film Board of Canada, the film follows eleven strangers from Vancouver's LGBTQ community over fifteen months after they unite to help a queer youth escape life-threatening violence in Uganda.

Acting 
Don't Quit Your Gay Job is a half-hour reality series broadcast on OUTtv in Canada and Europe. Each episode features Sean Horlor competing with his friend Rob Easton to see who can be the most successful at stereotypical gay jobs. The first season of the show in 2009 has six episodes about jobs as bus driver, stripper, equestrian, dominatrix, model and drag. The second season featured curling, hockey, the police and extreme wrestling.

Writing
In 2003, Horlor collaborated with the Vancouver poet Matt Rader and the illustrator James Kingsley to publish Our Mission, Our Moment through Rader's publishing company, Mosquito Press. A hand-bound chapbook, Our Mission, Our Moment contains eight poetic transpositions of the speeches of George W. Bush.

His poem "In Praise of Beauty" won first place for poetry in This Magazines 2006 Great Canadian Literary Hunt and "St. Brendan and the Isle of Sheep" was a 2006 Editor's Choice in Arc Poetry Magazines Poem of the Year contest.

His first poetry collection, Made Beautiful by Use, was published by the Winnipeg publisher Signature Editions in 2007. Edited by the poet John Barton, the collection was described as "a striking and, yes, beautiful set of musings on belief, sex, and power". It was longlisted for the 2008 ReLit Awards.

His work also appeared in the groundbreaking Seminal: The Anthology of Canada’s Gay Male Poets (Arsenal Pulp Press, 2007), edited by the poets Billeh Nickerson and John Barton.

Horlor is also a freelance writer. He has written for The Globe and Mail and The Vancouver Sun. He has worked as a speechwriter for Gordon Campbell, the Liberal premier of British Columbia. He wrote Cocked & Loaded, a bi-weekly social column, and also blogged on Up Your Alley for Xtra! West.

Nootka St. Film Company
Nootka St. Film Company is a production house established by Sean Horlor in partnership with Steve J. Adams in Vancouver to produce theatrical and television documentaries, series television, and short-form storytelling.

In popular culture
In 2010, he competed in an international competition hosted by Tourisme Montréal to "search for the brightest star under the rainbow" and won the first annual Queer of the Year title.

He partnered Steve J. Adams in an episode of Hot Pink Shorts: The Making Of in which they co-directed a short film within one day. In the one-hour show, they were given advice on how to proceed with the short. The result was the seven-minute short Just the Tip. The cast included Morgan David Jones playing Jayson, Kerrie Gee as Kate and Dan Dumsha as Throb. The film was co-produced by Horlor and Adams.

Bibliography 
 Our Mission, Our Moment (Mosquito Press, 2003)
 Made Beautiful by Use (Signature Editions, 2007)

Filmography
Just The Tip (2012)
Only One (2016)
A Small Part Of Me (2016)
Angela (2016)
Hunting Giants (2017) 
Brunch Queen (2018) 
The Day Don Died (2018) 
Dear Reader (2021) 
Someone Like Me (2021)

References

External links 
 
 Sean Horlor and Steve J. Adams official website
 Nootka St. Film Company official website
 OUTtv page for Don't Quit Your Gay Job
 Don't Quit Your Gay Job Facebook fanpage
 Up Your Alley: Vancouver's gay blog on Xtra.ca

1981 births
Living people
Canadian documentary film directors
Film producers from British Columbia
Canadian male television actors
Canadian male screenwriters
Film directors from Edmonton
Film directors from Vancouver
LGBT film directors
21st-century Canadian poets
Canadian television hosts
Canadian gay actors
Canadian gay writers
Canadian gay artists
Writers from Edmonton
Writers from Vancouver
Writers from Victoria, British Columbia
LGBT film producers
Canadian LGBT broadcasters
Canadian LGBT poets
Canadian male poets
21st-century Canadian male writers
Gay poets
Gay screenwriters
21st-century Canadian LGBT people